This is a list of British Rail diesel multiple-unit train classes.

For a historical overview of diesel multiple unit train development in Great Britain, see British railcars and diesel multiple units.

Pre-nationalisation designs

 GWR railcars
 LMS railcars

First Generation

Early BR DMUs (79xxx series)

TOPS classes

Second generation

Lightweight railcars

Pacers

Sprinters

Turbos

Networker

Turbostar

Coradias

Desiro

Civity

Diesel-electric multiple units (DEMUs)

Southern Region DEMUs

Second Generation

Voyager-style express DEMUs

High-speed trains

See also
 List of British Rail electric multiple unit classes
 British Rail locomotive and multiple unit numbering and classification
 British Rail coach type codes

References

External links

 List
British Rail diesel multiple unit classes